Aphanes (parsley-piert) is a genus of around 20 species in the rose family (Rosaceae), native to Europe, Asia and Australia. A 2003 study indicated that Aphanes may belong to the genus Alchemilla, commonly called lady's-mantle. They are slender, annual prostrate herbs, much-branched with deeply lobed leaves, pilose (covered with soft hair) and on short petioles. The tiny green to yellow flowers without petals grow in clusters in the denticulate leaflike stipules.

Species include:
Aphanes andicola Rothm.
Aphanes arvensis L. – field parsley-piert, western lady's-mantle, parsley breakstone
Aphanes australiana – Australian piert
Aphanes cotopaxiensis Romoleroux & Frost-Olsen
Aphanes cuneifolia (Nutt.) Rydb.
Aphanes looseri Rothm.
Aphanes microcarpa (Boiss. & Reut.) Rothm. (syn. A. australis, A. inexpectata) – slender parsley-piert
Aphanes occidentalis (Nutt.) Rydb. – dew cup, lady's mantle

References

External links

 
Rosaceae genera
Demulcents